

Early life

Karen Graham was born in Gulfport, Mississippi in 1945.

Career 
After college, Graham moved to New York City to pursue a career as a French-language high school teacher.

In 1969, Graham met model agency owner Eileen Ford while shopping at Bonwit Teller in Manhattan. Ford suggested that she become a model and shared her business card. This interaction launched Graham’s modelling career.

Graham's early work included a photo shoot for Irving Penn. Penn saw potential in Graham and wanted to include her in a shoot for Vogue. The photographer insisted that the model be featured in the fashion spread, despite resistance from Vogue’s editor-in-chief at the time, Diana Vreeland, due to Graham’s small stature. Following this, Graham was featured on the cover of Vogue magazine 20 times between 1970 and 1975.

The "Estee Lauder Woman" (1970-1985)

Graham's first notable modelling job was an Estee Lauder advertising campaign.  The company began employing her intermittently during 1970 and 1971 to appear in their print ads. She worked with Chicago photographer Victor Skrebneski.  By 1973, she had become Estee Lauder's exclusive spokesmodel.   It was a job she would do for the rest of the decade, appearing in print and television ads that presented her in tasteful, elegant, generously appointed tableaux - a parlor, a drawing room, a veranda - to represent the image the Estee Lauder company created for itself.

In these ads, Graham was never identified by name, which Estee Lauder herself frankly admitted was deliberate.  Mrs. Lauder did not want to dilute attention on the product by focusing more attention on the model in the ads.  Many people, unfamiliar with the fashion and modeling world, thought Graham was, in fact, Mrs. Lauder.  Ironically, the ads were a reflection of Mrs. Lauder's own idea of a woman of taste and sophistication.  Skrebneski was happy to oblige, decorating his sets with Chinese vases, Pablo Picasso ceramics, and well-stocked bookshelves.  Because the Lauder company aimed its products at upper-income women, at expensive prices, the ads had to project luxury.  Various props were used - dolls, horses, and, curiously, a framed photograph of Nicholas II, the last czar of Russia, in a 1981 ad.  The ad campaigns were meant to project traditional, Old-World elegance.  An exception was an ad campaign for the Lauder company's "Swiss age-controlling skincare program," in which Skrebneski photographed Graham standing among edged cylinders in a futuristic tableau and wearing her hair back, adorned with what looked like a plastic stereo headset and worn as if it were a space-age tiara.
  
Karen Graham was joined by model Shaun Casey in the Estee Lauder campaign in 1981, and for the next four years the Lauder company was thus represented by two spokesmodels. Graham quit in 1985, when she turned 40; as she told People magazine in 2000, she decided to leave modeling while she was still on top. Casey only briefly appeared in magazine advertisements before being fired and replaced with future news anchorwoman Willow Bay.

Fly fishing and more modeling
Graham remained in New York City for another six years before she moved to Rosendale, New York, where she pursued her hobby, fly fishing.  She had taken up the sport in the seventies, after her brother had given everyone in her family a fly rod.  Her passion for fly fishing led to a second career as a fly-fishing school operator and instructor, when she co-founded, with veteran fisherman Bert Darrow, Fly Fishing With Bert and Karen.

In 1999, she returned to modeling for Estee Lauder's "Resilience Lift" face cream, aimed at older women and designed to help female skin reproduce the skin nutrients that prevent wrinkles.  Graham was happy to return to modeling for the campaign, which lasted for a few years, and Victor Skrebneski returned to shoot the print ads for the Lauder company after leaving in 1993. Graham also did a few seasons of ESPN2's fishing series "In Search of Fly Water," and now lives in the foothills of North Carolina. In addition to fly fishing, she takes a great interest in horseback riding.

Personal life

In 1974, Graham was engaged to David Frost. In 1974, Graham married Chicagoan, Delbert W. Coleman, casino owner, who ran the Stardust Hotel in Las Vegas, Nevada.

In Mississippi, she had a son, Graham Douglas Mavar, after Graham's maiden name, with Sam Mavar.

References

External links

1945 births
Living people
Female models from Mississippi
American television personalities
American women television personalities
People from Gulfport, Mississippi
People from Rosendale, New York
21st-century American women